Juan Carlos Traspaderne de la Fuente (born February 2, 1956) is a retired male long-distance runner from Spain, who represented his native country at the 1984 Summer Olympics in the men's marathon. He set his personal best (2:11:34) on August 14, 1983 at the men's marathon in Helsinki, Finland, clocking a national record at that time. Traspaderne won the national marathon title in 1983.

Achievements

References
 sports-reference
 ARRS 1983 Year Ranking

1956 births
Living people
Spanish male long-distance runners
Athletes (track and field) at the 1984 Summer Olympics
Olympic athletes of Spain